Acacia triptera, commonly known as spurwing wattle, is an erect or spreading shrub which is endemic to Australia.

Description
Like most species of Acacia it has phyllodes rather than true leaves. The evergreen phyllodes have many longitudinal veins that are very close together. The bright yellow flowerheads appear from August to November.

Distribution
The species occurs on sandhills or rocky outcrops in mallee, woodland or heath in Victoria, New South Wales and Queensland.

Taxonomy
The species was first formally described in 1842 by English botanist George Bentham in the  London Journal of Botany. His description was based on plant material collected from north of the Warrumbungles.

Cultivation
Established plants tolerate dry periods and moderate frost.

References

triptera
Flora of New South Wales
Flora of Queensland
Flora of Victoria (Australia)
Fabales of Australia
Plants described in 1842
Taxa named by George Bentham